Marc Schaub (born April 12, 1992) is a German professional ice hockey player. He is currently playing for Krefeld Pinguine in the Deutsche Eishockey Liga.

References

External links

1992 births
Living people
German ice hockey right wingers
Krefeld Pinguine players
Sportspeople from Krefeld